Cepphus is a genus of seabirds in the auk family also referred to as true guillemots or, in North America, simply as guillemots. The genus name Cepphus is from Ancient Greek  kepphos, a pale waterbird mentioned by Greek authors including Aristotle. The English word "guillemot" is from French guillemot probably derived from Guillaume, "William". "Murre" is of uncertain origins, but may imitate the call of the common guillemot.

These are medium-sized birds with mainly black plumage in the breeding season, thin dark bills and red legs and feet. Two species have white wing patches, the third has white facial “spectacles”. They are much paler in winter plumage, mottled above and white below.

The breeding habitat is rocky shores and islands on the coasts of the northern Atlantic and Pacific Oceans. They usually lay their eggs in rocky sites near water.

These birds may overwinter in their breeding areas, moving to open waters if necessary, but usually not migrating very far south.

They dive for food from the surface, swimming underwater. They mainly eat fish and crustaceans, also some molluscs, insects and plant material.

The species are:

There are also fossil forms
 Cepphus olsoni Howard, 1982 (San Luis Rey River Late Miocene - Early Pliocene of W USA)
 Cepphus storeri Harrison, 1977 (Red Crag of Suffolk Late Miocene - England
 Cepphus cf. columba (Lawrence Canyon Early Pliocene of W USA)
 Cepphus cf. grylle (San Diego Late Pliocene, W USA)

The latter two resemble the extant species, but because of the considerable distance in time or space from their current occurrence may represent distinct species.

References

 
Bird genera
Guillemots
Messinian first appearances
Extant Miocene first appearances